Paresh Jasmat Patel (born 29 July 1965) is a former field hockey player from New Zealand, who finished in eighth position with the Men's National Team, nicknamed Black Sticks, at the 1992 Summer Olympics in Barcelona, Spain. He was born in Auckland.

References
 New Zealand Olympic Committee

External links
 

New Zealand male field hockey players
Field hockey players at the 1992 Summer Olympics
Olympic field hockey players of New Zealand
Field hockey players from Auckland
1965 births
Living people
New Zealand sportspeople of Indian descent